The 2015 Aspria Tennis Cup was a professional tennis tournament played on clay courts. It was the tenth edition of the tournament which was part of the 2015 ATP Challenger Tour. It took place in Milan, Italy, between 20 and 28 June 2015.

Singles main-draw entrants

Seeds

 1 Rankings are as of June 15, 2015.

Other entrants
The following players received wildcards into the singles main draw:
  Filippo Baldi
  Gianluigi Quinzi
  Pietro Licciardi
  Gianluca Mager

The following players received entry from the qualifying draw:
  Benoît Paire
  Rogério Dutra Silva
  Flavio Cipolla
  Laslo Đere

The following player received entry as special exempt:
  Calvin Hemery
  José Checa Calvo

Doubles main-draw entrants

Seeds

1 Rankings as of June 15, 2015.

Other entrants
The following pairs received wildcards into the doubles main draw:
  Davide Carpi /  Stefano Mezzadri
  Filippo Baldi /  Gianluigi Quinzi
  Alessandro Giannessi /  Pietro Licciardi

Champions

Singles

  Federico Delbonis def.  Rogério Dutra Silva, 6–1, 7–6(8–6).

Doubles

  Nikola Mektić /  Antonio Šančić def.  Cristian Garín /  Juan Carlos Sáez, 6–3, 6–4.

References

External links
Official Website

Aspria Tennis Cup
Aspria Tennis Cup